Polauchenia is a genus of thread-legged bug (Emesinae). Only five species have been described.

Partial Species list

Polauchenia marcapata Wygodzinsky, 1966
Polauchenia protentor McAtee and Malloch, 1925

References

Reduviidae